Aperahama Tama-i-parea (fl. 1840–1882) was a notable New Zealand tribal leader. Of Māori descent, he identified with the Nga Rauru iwi. He was active from about 1840.

See also
Pehimana

References

Year of birth missing
1882 deaths
Ngā Rauru people